Shia Islam in Yemen is practiced by a significant minority of the population; it is estimated that Zaydi Muslims comprise about 35 percent of the population. Sunnis make up 65 percent, and there are also much smaller communities of Muslims who are of the Isma'ili and Twelver Shia sects.

The Zaydis ruled Yemen for 1,000 years up until 1962. During this time, they ferociously defended their independence and fought off foreign powers (Umayyads, Egypt, the Ottomans) who controlled Lower Yemen and tried to extend their rule to the north. The Zaydi branch of Islam, also known as the Fivers, is a sect of Islam almost exclusively extant only in Yemen.

Population
Religion in Yemen consists primarily of two principal Islamic religious groups: 65% of the Muslim population is Sunni Muslim and around 35% is Zaydi Shia, according to the UNHCR. Shias are primarily Zaydi and there are also significant minorities of Twelver and Isma'ili Shias. On the whole, Yemeni Shias make up "over one-quarter of Yemen's 25 million people".

Zaydis are generally found in the north and northwest and Shafi'is in the south and southeast. There are also approximately 3,000 Christians and 400 Jews.

History
According to historical narrations, Islamic identities in Yemen have been categorized into two main Islamic orientations: Shia Zaydism and Sunni Shafi‘i. Also, small groups of Shia Ismailis and some Jewish communities are seen in the country. The population density of Zaydis historically is placed in the north of Yemen, in Sa’dah, Amran, al-Jawf, Hajjah and Dhamar provinces, as well as Shafiism,  is the dominant school of jurisprudence in lower Yemen the eastern part of the country and the Tihamah. However, it can not be said that Zaydies and shafei populations live in Separated regions. For instance, the Sa’dah region, is known as the residents of Zaydism but in some areas, notably al-Hishwah, al-Zahir, Shida and Ghamr, Sunnis make up a considerable part of the population.

The Zaydis belong to a sect of Shia Islam that their generation reaches to eponym Zayd ibn Ali, the great-grandson of Ali Shia first Imam and Zayd ibn Ali rebelled against Umayyad government in 740 CE after death of Husayn ibn Ali at Karbala.  As the life of first Zaydi Imam in Yemen, Yahya b. al-Husayn (d.911), he made efforts to establish his rule over the tribes in the north of Yemen.

Houthi movement

According to Charles Schmitz, a professor at Towson University, the Houthis' origins harken back to Al-Shabab al-Muminin (the Believing Youth), a group active in the early 1990s. The Believing Youth concentrated on raising awareness about the Zaydi branch of Shia Islam, which had ruled Yemen for centuries. However after the North Yemen Civil War in the 1960s, they were suppressed by the Yemeni government. Out of them became Yemen's Shia minority, containing 25% of the country's Muslims.

Similar to Sunni Muslims in matters of religious law and rulings, the Houthi believe in the concept of an Imamate as being essential to their religion, making them distinct from Sunni Muslims.

The Houthi movement, which belongs to Yemen's Zaydi Muslim community and that fought a series of rebellions against Ali Abdullah Saleh during the last decade, took control of its northern heartland around Saada province and its nearby areas.

See also
Islam in Yemen
 Freedom of religion in Yemen
 Islamic history of Yemen
 Religion in Yemen

References